Saas Bina Sasural (lit: in-law without mother-in-law) is an Indian dramedy based on the story of a young lady, Taanya, a.k.a. Toasty, who has a "sasural" (in-laws' house) consisting of seven quirky men, deprived of a "saas" (mother-in-law). The series aired on Sony Entertainment Television. The series premiered on 18 October 2010, and was produced by Vipul D. Shah of Optimystix Entertainment. The show went off-air on 6 September 2012.

Plot

Taanya Sharma, lovingly called Toasty, is a school-teacher in love with a kindhearted man, Tej Prakash Chaturvedi, Chaturvedi family's third son. Though Tej's family has no women in it (all seven family members are men who hate women) after the family's youngest son Gyan successfully convinces them all, the family eventually agrees to their marriage and the grand wedding takes place. Thus the rule of the Chaturvedi family which forbade to touch or even talk with women is broken. Toasty then finds herself in a family in which there is a Dadaji (grandfather), Pitaji (father) and five brothers, Tej being the middle one. As all the women who came in this family are gone, she has to play the role of a warden for these men.

Toasty finds out that the eldest son, Pashu, was married to Maalti. Maalti had run away as she thought that she was treated as a maid in this family. She was brainwashed by her evil mother. To get away from the family Maalti falsely accused Ved of molestation and Pitaji for demanding dowry. While she was leaving home, Dadaji tries to stop her but trips on stairs thus losing his ability to walk. Toasty clears all the misunderstandings and brings back Maalti. The family also accepts her back.

Tej plans to step out of his father’s business and carves out his own business creating a fight between him and Pashu. While some of the family members, like Toasty did not want their years old family shop to close. As per a challenge which said that the person who earns less will have close his shop, Tej at last wins and goes to Pune to buy goods, where on the way he meets with an accident. Toasty and others find him in a hospital in Pune, fit and fine, and after this incident Tej plans to close his shop and resumes working in his father’s business. While, Tej and Pashu reunite.

Ved and Nitika (Toasty's friend) develop feelings for each other with the moments they share with each other. Chaturvedis decide to get them married. But Pitaji brings in his deceased friend’s daughter, Kiya and tells that he had promised his dying friend that his daughter Kiya would be married to Ved. Kiya is also stubborn to marry Ved as this is the only access she has to her dead father’s property. Finally to fulfill his father's wishes Ved agrees to marry Kiya. Soon it is revealed that Kiya is a spoiled and villainous brat who has been married earlier to a man named, Jai Malhotra (Eijaz Khan). Jai starts blackmailing her for money. Toasty reveals the truth and Kiya is ousted. Ved then marries Nitika.

Maalti gets to know that she is pregnant and hence the family decides to bring Ganga Devi to stay with them and take care of her. Ganga Devi (called Naani Maa) is Pitaji's mother-in-law (Vimla’s mother). She is an orthodox person, who has great faith in Indian traditions but is tough and blunt in her approach. She sees that the family is having several problems with Nitika going to her job leaving Toasty alone to manage all the works with Maalti being pregnant. Naani Maa doesn't like this and hence asks Nitika to quit her job. But all family members disagree with this.

In a misunderstanding between Toasty and Naani Maa, Naani Maa scolds her and hence Toasty leaves home. She meets an accident and goes in coma. But Naani Maa makes an Ayurvedic medicine for her and Toasty returns to her family. Still being weak, Nitika has to do all the household chores. Ved and Pashu fight over this and Ved plans to step out of the house. All family members convince Ved and Pashu to apologize to each other and then Ved returns home.

One day Tej wins a lottery ticket of 1 crore but to prevent wedges in the family they donate the money to a hospital in the name of Vimla, after spending some. Later the Chaturvedis buy a new shop of 70 lakh but everything gets upside down when the owner cheats them and the market is sealed. Business was the primary income of the family and they are forced to search for service jobs, which they get after a series of hits and misses. Tej gets his job as a manager in a beauty parlour. His boss's daughter, Divya (Neha Jhulka) falls in love with Tej. After finding out that Tej is married she tries to separate Tej and Toasty, but in vain. And soon after this incident the market's seal is taken off, and they are able to restart their business in two shops!

In this moment of joy, Toasty gets to know that she has brain tumor and learns that she has very less time left. She tends not to tell this to her family and make them sad, and plans to live her last days by making her family happy. At the same time her childhood friend, Simran (or, Smiley) comes to stay with the Chaturvedis who brings back the old and happy memories of the family members. Dadaji learns about Toasty's health and worries but keeps shut after force from Toasty. He makes Toasty think for Tej. She plans to get Tej married to a woman who would love and care for him like her and sees Smiley as the perfect one. She strives to bring them close to each other. But soon later she plans to leave the family as she hardly has any time to live. However, Nitika and Maalti learns about Toasty's disease individually. Maalti also informs Pashu. While the rest remain unaware of it until then when Toasty asks her parents to say that she never reached her destination as she died of brain tumor before that. They obey her and the Chaturvedis after learning about Toasty's death break into pieces.

Soon later Maalti's baby is born. Smiley helped in her delivery but after this she plans to leave the family and go, but is stopped by the Chaturvedis. Pashu's daughter is named Toasty in memory of Toasty. Also, Smiley and Tej participate in the Salsa competition because it was Toasty's wish and Smiley eventually falls in love with Tej. Since it was Toasty's wish to get Smiley and Tej married, the whole family arrange Smiley's marriage to Tej. Tej unwillingly agrees to marry Smiley because it was Toasty's wish. However, when Tej finds out that Toasty is alive, he tries backing out of the marriage, despite knowing the fact that Smiley is in love with him. He tries convincing the family about Toasty's existence, but nobody except Smiley believes him. Smiley helps Tej in finding Toasty and they succeed. Tej forces Toasty to return home and after much persuasion she returns, returning the smiles of all the family members. She meets her niece, and Chedidlal promises to treat Toasty to the biggest surgeon available. After that Toasty and Tej remarry.

Cast

Main
 Ravi Dubey as Tej Prakash Chatuvedi
 Aishwarya Sakhuja as Tanya Tej Prakash Chaturvedi / Toasty (née Sharma)

Recurring 
 Darshan Jariwala as Cheddilal Anandilal Chaturvedi
 Arvind Vaidya as Anandilal Chaturvedi, Cheddilal's father
 Rajendra Chawla as Pashupatinath Chaturvedi
 Rohini Banerjee as Madhu Maalti Pashupatinath Chaturvedi
 Amit Varma as Jai Malhotra
 Rucha Gujarathi as Kiya Jai Malhotra / Kiya Ved Chaturvedi
 Rishi Khurana as Ved Prakash Chaturvedi
 Shruti Bapna as Nitika Ved Prakash Chaturvedi, Toasty's best friend
 Rajeev Kumar as Lalit Kumar Sharma, Toasty's father
 Anjali Mukhi as Sudha Lalit Kumar Sharma, Toasty's mother
 Ketaki Chitale as Dimple Lalit Kumar Sharma, Toasty's Sister, Lalit and Sudha's daughter
 Shraman Jain as Pracheen Prakash Chaturvedi
 Meghan Jadhav as Gyan Prakash Chaturvedi
 Simple Kaul as Smita Lumba, Toasty's friend
 Rubina Dilaik as Simran / Smiley, Toasty's friend
 Kavita Vaid as Shanti (Buaa)
 Gopi Desai as Ganga Devi
 Anchal Sabharwal as Damini, Toasty's friend
 Kiran Bhargava as Shobha Devi
 Tanvi Thakkar as Riya
 Neha Jhulka as Divya
 Yogesh Tripathi as Baiju
 Indraneel Bhattacharya as Mr. Patel (Tej's boss)
 Riyanka Chanda as Ekta (special appearance as Nitika's cousin)
 Eijaz Khan as Eijaz (special appearance in the song "Zor Ka Jhatka Dheere Se Laga")

Awards

Sequel
In 2020, Saas Bina Sasural was revived for Season 2. The show was initially titled as Saas Bina Sasural 2 but later was renamed as Sargam Ki Sadhe Satii. The sequel has comedy genre with Anjali Tatrari as Sargam Aparshakti Awasthi and Kunal Saluja as Aparshakti Awasthi(Appu) as leads. Darshan Jariwala reprised for the role of Cheddilal Anandilal Awasthi as Aparshakti's father. The show also gained popularity but due to second wave COVID-19 pandemic, the show went off air with abrupt ending within 2 months on 23 April 2021 with 45 episodes.

Crossover 
On 13 April 2012 (Episode 321) Saas Bina Sasural had a crossover with Parvarrish – Kuchh Khattee Kuchh Meethi.

References

External links
 Saas Bina Sasural official site on Sony TV India

Sony Entertainment Television original programming
Indian drama television series
Indian television soap operas
2010 Indian television series debuts
2012 Indian television series endings
Comedy-drama television series
Television series by Optimystix Entertainment